Gacko is a town and municipality located in Republika Srpska, an entity of Bosnia and Herzegovina. It is situated in the region of East Herzegovina. As of 2013, the town has a population of 5,784 inhabitants, while the municipality has 8,990 inhabitants.

Geography 

The town is near the state border with Montenegro.

History

Middle Ages 

In the 14th century the region was governed by the powerful Vojinović family.

In 1359, veliki čelnik Dimitrije held the region.

Ottoman period

The rebels were defeated at the field of Gacko. It ultimately failed due to lack of foreign support.

Modern history
Austro-Hungarian authorities took it over in 1878, a decision which was made at the Berlin Congress. In 1908, Austria-Hungary annexed Bosnia and Herzegovina sparking the Bosnian crisis which eventually led to World War I.

After that war, Gacko joined the State of Serbs, Croats and Slovenes, going on to the Kingdom of Serbs, Croats and Slovenes by the end of 1918. These were the first incarnations of Yugoslavia.

Croatian fascist Ustaše movement committed the Gacko massacre on 4 June 1941. In response, on 6 June 1941 the rebels from Gacko under command of Orthodox priest Radojica Perišić started the uprising against the genocidal Independent State of Croatia known as June 1941 uprising in eastern Herzegovina. The communist historiography intentionally ignored pre-22 June rebels in Eastern Herzegovina and Sanski Most because they occurred in the period of collaboration between communists and fascists, so it would contradict the communist narrative about rebels being led by communists. On the other hand, the first Partisan battalion established in Gacko at the end of 1941 was named "6th June" in honor of the first date of the uprising. In period after the Fall of the Berlin Wall Gacko municipality proclaimed 6 June as their holiday in honor of the beginning of the uprising and held public ceremonies on 6 June named as the Day of Gacko.

Settlements
Aside from the town of Gacko, the municipality includes the following settlements:

 Avtovac
 Bahori
 Bašići
 Berušica
 Brajićevići
 Branilovići
 Cernica
 Čemerno
 Danići
 Dobrelji
 Domrke
 Donja Bodežišta
 Dramešina
 Dražljevo
 Drugovići
 Dubljevići
 Fojnica
 Gareva
 Gornja Bodežišta
 Gračanica
 Gradina
 Hodinići
 Igri
 Izgori
 Jabuka
 Jasenik
 Jugovići
 Kazanci
 Ključ
 Kokorina
 Kravarevo
 Kula
 Lipnik
 Lončari
 Luka
 Lukovice
 Ljeskov Dub
 Medanići
 Međuljići
 Mekavci
 Melečići
 Miholjače
 Mjedenik
 Mrđenovići
 Muhovići
 Nadinići
 Novi Dulići
 Platice
 Poda
 Pridvorica
 Pržine
 Ravni
 Rudo Polje
 Samobor
 Slivlja
 Soderi
 Srđevići
 Stambelići
 Stari Dulići
 Stepen
 Stolac
 Šipovica
 Šumići
 Ulinje
 Višnjevo
 Vratkovići
 Vrba
 Zagradci
 Zurovići
 Žanjevica

Demographics

Population

Ethnic composition

Economy

The Gacko coal mine and thermoelectric powerplant is located the municipality, and is also the largest employer in the area.

The following table gives a preview of total number of registered people employed in legal entities per their core activity (as of 2018):

Sport 
The local football club, FK Mladost Gacko, plays in the First League of the Republika Srpska.
 
Volleyball teams, men and women, are among the most successful in the BiH. With women's volleyball team being vice champion multiple times, also winning Cup of Republika Srpska once.

Notable people
 Admir Ćatović, footballer
 Nemanja Supić, footballer
 Vukašin Višnjevac, football coach
 Vule Avdalović, basketball player
 Nemanja Gordić, basketball player
 Sava Vladislavich
 Bogdan Zimonjić

See also 
 Fazlagić Tower

References

Bibliography
 
 HadžiMuhamedović, Safet (2018) Waiting for Elijah: Time and Encounter in a Bosnian Landscape. New York and Oxford: Berghahn Books.

External links 

 

 
Populated places in Gacko
Cities and towns in Republika Srpska